Madima is a surname. Notable people with the surname include:

E. S. Madima, South African writer
Tenda Madima, South African writer

Bantu-language surnames